Tirathaba xuthoptera is a species of moth of the family Pyralidae. It was described by Alfred Jefferis Turner in 1937. It is found in Australia.

References 

Tirathabini
Moths described in 1937